Corey Michael Mixter (born February 12, 1987) known professionally under his pseudonym Titanic Sinclair, is an American director, producer, singer-songwriter and internet personality. He was previously one-half of the indie pop duo Mars Argo and a creative collaborator of American singer and YouTube personality Poppy.

Collaborations 
From 2009 to 2014, Sinclair directed and wrote the video content for the Mars Argo internet series Computer Show on YouTube. Sinclair also wrote and produced the duo's musical albums they released independently.

In 2010, Sinclair directed the music video for Stepdad's song "My Leather, My Fur, My Nails".

Sinclair was commissioned to create an acoustic video series for singer/musician Børns. One video featured LA singer/songwriter Zella Day. The videos featured music from Børns' first EP titled Candy which Sinclair also provided the EP artwork for.

After moving to Los Angeles in 2013 to pursue a musical career, Poppy collaborated with Sinclair on a long series of abstract performance art, music, and promotional videos on YouTube which presented Poppy as a mysterious, not-quite-human internet-created character. Sinclair and Poppy then worked together on writing songs, creating albums, a concert tour, a YouTube Red internet show, and their continuing series of several hundred YouTube videos. In June 2018, the pair launched Poppy.Church, an interactive fan site.

In August 2016, Sinclair directed the music video for the Knox Hamilton song titled "Washed Up Together".

In June 2019, Sinclair directed the music video for rapper Vic Mensa's song "Camp America".

Controversies and abuse allegations

Mars Argo lawsuit 
On April 17, 2018, Sinclair's former collaborator and partner Mars Argo filed a lawsuit in federal court against Sinclair and Poppy alleging copyright infringement, stating that Sinclair based Poppy's online persona on hers, as well as emotional and physical abuse Sinclair had allegedly subjected her to in the period after their separation and the subsequent abandonment of the project. On May 7, Poppy made a public statement about the "frivolous" lawsuit, saying Argo was attempting to manipulate her psychologically and that Mars was working with a person who had allegedly abused Poppy in the past, Josh Moran. She called the suit a "publicity campaign" and a "desperate grab for fame". It was settled out of court on September 14 "with no money exchanging hands". Argo released a statement in January 2019 that all rights to Mars Argo had been assigned to her as part of the settlement.

Poppy 
On December 29, 2019, Poppy released a statement on Twitter announcing that she parted ways with Sinclair, claiming that he "glamorizes suicide" and used it as a way to manipulate her. An example of this behavior is an instance in which Poppy alleges Sinclair was going to hang himself with one of her personal belongings and had also messaged fans details about his suicidal attempts for attention. She said that Sinclair "lives an illusion that he is a gift to this Earth" and that she was "trapped in a mess that [she] needed to dig [her]self out of." Prior to the statement, Sinclair's directorial credits were removed from recent videos on Poppy's YouTube channel, with his songwriting credits later being removed from several songs on streaming platforms.

Discography

Studio albums

EPs

Singles

Songwriting credits

References

External links 

Living people
American rock musicians
American music video directors
American rock singers
American film directors
American YouTubers
People from Michigan
1987 births
21st-century American singers